Micro-Cap is a SPICE compatible analog/digital circuit simulator with an integrated schematic editor that provides an interactive sketch and simulate environment for electronics engineers. It was developed by Spectrum Software and is currently at version 12.  In July 2019, Spectrum Software closed down and Micro-Cap was released as freeware, and they no longer provide technical support or software updates.  Previously, Micro-Cap was only available under a paid commercial license.

Version history
The name Micro-Cap was derived from the term Microcomputer Circuit Analysis Program.  The forerunners to the Micro-Cap simulator were the Logic Designer and Simulator. Released in June 1980, this product was the first integrated circuit editor and logic simulation system available for personal computers. Its primary goal was to provide a “circuit creation and simulation” environment for digital simulation.

In August 1981, the analog equivalent of the first program, Circuit Designer and Simulator, was released. Its integrated text editor created circuit descriptions for a simple, linear, analog simulator.  September 1982 saw the release of the first Micro-Cap package as a successor to the Circuit Designer and Simulator.

 1982 Micro-Cap
 1984 Micro-Cap 2
 1988 Micro-Cap 3
 1992 Micro-Cap 4
 1995 Micro-Cap 5
 1997 Micro-Cap 5 2.0
 1999 Micro-Cap 6
 2001 Micro-Cap 7
 2004 Micro-Cap 8
 2007 Micro-Cap 9
 2010 Micro-Cap 10
 2013 Micro-Cap 11
 2018 Micro-Cap 12 - the final major version

See also

 Comparison of EDA software
 List of free electronics circuit simulators

References

Notes

 Spice Programs: Computerized Circuit Analysis For Analog EEs
 Analysis of digital filters via SPICE-family programs
 Modeling IIj Noise in HEMTS with SPICE-Based Micro-Cap
 AC Analysis of Idealized Switched-Capacitor Circuits in Spice-Compatible Programs
 White Paper: A New Zobel Network for Audio
 Get more power with a boosted triode

External links
 
 Download Micro-Cap
 Micro-Cap Brochure
 Micro-Cap Application Notes

Electronic design automation software
Electronic circuit simulators